John Bampfield (c. 1586 – c. 1657) of Poltimore and North Molton, Devon, England, was a Member of Parliament for Tiverton in Devon (1621) and for the prestigious county seat of Devon (1628-9).

Origins
He was the eldest son and heir of Sir Amias Bampfield (died 1626), MP,  of Poltimore and North Molton, by his wife Elizabeth Clifton, a daughter of Sir John Clifton of Barrington Court, Somerset.

Career
He matriculated at Exeter College, Oxford on 13 July 1604, aged 18. He was a law student at the Middle Temple in 1607. In 1621 he was elected a Member of Parliament for Tiverton, Devon. He was elected an MP for Devon in 1628 and sat until 1629 when King Charles I decided to rule without parliament for eleven years.

Marriage and children
In 1602 Bampfield married Elizabeth Drake, a daughter of Thomas Drake (d.1605) of Buckland Drake, Devon, and a niece of Admiral Sir Francis Drake (d.1596) of Buckland Abbey, Devon. His sister Jane Bampfield married Francis Drake, a brother of Elizabeth Drake. By his wife he had  children including:
Amias Bampfylde, eldest son, who died in Italy without children.
Arthur Bampfield, second son, died without children.
Sir John Bampfylde, 1st Baronet (1610–1650), third son and heir apparent, one of Devon's Parliamentarian leaders during the Civil War, who predeceased his father. The heir to his baronetcy and paternal inheritance was his eldest son Sir Coplestone Bampfylde, 2nd Baronet (c. 1633 – 1692).
Francis Bampfield (died 1663/4), sixth son, a Nonconformist minister who died in Newgate Prison.
Thomas Bampfield (died 1693), eighth son, MP, briefly Speaker of the House of Commons.

Sources
Venning, Tim & Hunneyball, Paul, biography of Bampfield, John (c.1586-c.1657), of Poltimore, Devon published in The History of Parliament: the House of Commons 1604-1629, ed. Andrew Thrush and John P. Ferris, Cambridge University Press, 2010
Vivian, Lt.Col. J.L., (Ed.) The Visitations of the County of Devon: Comprising the Heralds' Visitations of 1531, 1564 & 1620, Exeter, 1895, pp. 38–41, pedigree of Bamfield of Poltimore

References

 

1580s births
Year of death missing
Alumni of Exeter College, Oxford
Members of the Middle Temple
People from North Devon (district)
English MPs 1621–1622
English MPs 1628–1629
Members of the Parliament of England for Tiverton
Members of the Parliament of England (pre-1707) for Devon